Cadishead and Lower Irlam is an electoral ward of Salford, England created by the Local Government Boundary Commission for England (LGBCE) replacing the previous electoral wards of Cadishead and Irlam for the 2021 local elections.

It is represented in Westminster by Barbara Keeley MP for Worsley and Eccles South. The first councillors for the ward were elected at the 2021 local elections.

Councillors 
The ward is represented by three councillors, each elected for a four-year term.

The current councillors for the ward are Lewis Nelson (Labour), Hannah Robinson-Smith (Labour), and Joan Walsh (Labour).

 indicates seat up for re-election.

Elections in 2020s 
(*) denotes incumbent councillor seeking re-election.

May 2022

May 2021

References



Salford City Council Wards